Adam Georg von Agthe (12 August 1777 – 26 August 1826) was a major general in the Imperial Russian Army during the Napoleonic Wars. He was also known by his Russian name Egor Andreevich Akhte.

Biography

He was born into a Baltic-German noble family. He was promoted to lieutenant in 1796. He fought at the battle of Austerlitz in 1805, receiving a medal for distinction, and fought in the Russo-Turkish War between 1806 and 1811. He was awarded the Order of St George 4th class on 10 March 1812 for the capture of Batina and also fought at the battle of Borodino. He was promoted to major general after the battle of Leipzig in 1813, but was invalided out of the army on 15 April 1816 due to several injuries.

See also
List of Russian commanders in the Patriotic War of 1812

References

1777 births
1826 deaths
People from Kuressaare
People from Kreis Ösel
Baltic-German people
Imperial Russian major generals
Russian commanders of the Napoleonic Wars
Recipients of the Order of St. George
Recipients of the Gold Sword for Bravery